Owlerton Stadium, also known as Sheffield Stadium, is a purpose-built speedway track built in 1929 which also hosts greyhound racing The track is in Owlerton near Hillsborough in Sheffield, South Yorkshire, England. Greyhound racing takes place on Tuesday, Friday and Saturday evenings and every Monday and Thursday afternoon. There is a modern glass-fronted Panorama Restaurant accommodating up to 300 people, executive suites, fast food facilities and a number of bars.

The stadium is also home to the Sheffield Tigers Speedway team and hosts BriSCA Formula One stock car racing events. Speedway takes place on a Thursday evening and the stadium has a total capacity for 4,000 spectators.

It is operated by the A & S Leisure Group, the majority shareholder of which is Dave Allen. Allen was previously the chairman of football team Sheffield Wednesday who play at the nearby Hillsborough Stadium, which coincidentally was originally named Owlerton Stadium.

Speedway
Sheffield Tigers have run at Owlerton Stadium since it was built in 1929.

Sidecar Speedway
The British Sidecar Speedway Championship took place at the Stadium in 2010. It was won by Mark Cossar & Andi Wilson.

Rugby League
The stadium hosted the Sheffield Eagles' first ever game in September 1984; they left five years later following changes to crowd rules, however they returned for one season in 2014 after their previous home the Don Valley Stadium was demolished.

Greyhound racing

Origins and opening
In 1929 construction began on a 20-acre freehold site to build a new greyhound stadium in Owlerton. The site was surrounded by steel works with a steel forge directly on the north side and a cutlery forge directly on the west side. To the south was the Birley Meadow steel forge and Owlerton Bridge Rolling Mills steel works. The  only area without steel works was on the east side where allotments and gardens were to be found. The Penistone Road ran alongside the west and where Lowther Road originated it could take you directly to the stadium although today the main car park is on Livesey Street on the south side.
With the Darnall Stadium opening in 1927 Owlerton track became the second oval circuit greyhound racing in Sheffield. On 12 January 1932 an official opening night took place in regards to greyhound racing. The venue had initially been used for speedway with a first meeting held on 30 March 1929. The stands were subsequently altered to accommodate the impending greyhound racing with a newly built glass fronted grandstand.

The opening night attracted a crowd of 10,000. The press described the tote as a "mechanical and electrical marvel as it registered bets within fractions of a second as they were placed". Seven races were held and the first race over 525 yards the 'Oxford Stakes' was claimed by 3–1 shot 'Carbrook Ted' winning by two lengths in 33.63 secs. Adding variety to the meeting was a 700-yard race and a hurdle race. The five 525 yard flat race winning times spanned 32.40 to 35.78 secs.

Pre-war history
A third track arrived to the city of Sheffield in the form of Hyde Park Greyhound Stadium which would always remain independent leaving Darnall and Owlerton to licensed racing. Owlerton owned by Sheffield Sports Stadium Ltd became the primary track in Sheffield and the set-up of the track consisted of a 472 yards circumference with distances of 300, 500, 525 and 700 yards. The grandstand and club were situated on the home straight and there was a parade ring to be found behind these which allowed the public to view the greyhounds pre-race. The track had two hares, an 'Inside Sumner' and an 'Outside MS Cable'. The racing kennels were next to the parade ring and there were another 120 resident kennels that replaced the kennels formerly located at Wardsend Farm in a range of stone buildings.

Sam Vinter joined the track in the thirties as Racing Manager and owner/breeder Alf Morton bred and supplied the track with greyhounds using Irish Derby winner Marching Through Georgia as the sire. Morton was responsible for breeding Victor Ben Hur a track champion and record holder over both 500 & 700 yards in 1940. Duffys Arrival was once trained at the track before he went to (Coventry) trainer George McKay and two of the early trainers at the track were Harry Bidwell, who would have a thirty-year association with Owlerton, and Ted Brennan.

Post-war history 

Trade during the war was exceptional but there was very little open racing due to travel issues and it was not until 1950 that Ted Brennan started to establish himself as one of the leading northern trainers. The track claimed the 1951 News of the World Intertrack Championship, the greyhound racing equivalent of the F.A. Cup at the time. Jim Hookway became a resident trainer in 1953 and joined Brennan in dominating the northern scene. In 1959 Ted Brennan's brother Jack switched from the Darnall kennels to join Owlerton and Dancing Sheik trained by Ted Brennan became the first Derby finalist for the track.

The sixties saw rival track Darnall close down and Owlerton was bought by the Sheffield Corporation after a £185,000 offer had been accepted. The corporation converted the three private clubs into public bars which helped boost attendance figures and in 1969 they made £30,000 improvements to the Lowther Road grandstand. Hookway was rewarded with the title of Trainer of the Year which he shared with John Bassett in 1965. The accolade had been helped considerably by a greyhound called Clonmannon Flash who had won the Scottish Greyhound Derby & Edinburgh Cup double.

In February 1965 an Irish litter by Crazy Parachute out of Supreme Witch bred by Leo Stack included Tric-Trac, Spectre II, Forward King and Forward Flash. This litter made its way to Hookway and the Brennan brothers kennels and would become one of the greatest litters of all time. At White City on 24 June 1967 Tric-Trac defeated his brother Spectre II by one length in the 1967 English Greyhound Derby final. Hookway received the Trainer of the Year accolade for a second time.

By 1970 Owlerton introduced the Steel City Cup and as the decade progressed Sam Vinter the long serving Racing Manager retired in 1973 to be replaced by Terry Meynell. Ted Brennan retired the following year and his place was taken by Harry Crapper and Jim Hookway also retired after a very successful career. Sheffield replaced the grass circuit with an all-sand surface in 1978.

Terry Corden who held the lease at Derby Stadium added Sheffield to his portfolio by obtaining the lease at the track but the ageing stadium became a problem following the Hillsborough disaster in April 1989 which resulted in ramifications for the track. The Taylor Report and subsequent government actions on stadium safety meant a substantial financial boost was required at many stadia and as a result Corden sold Derby and the local council closed Sheffield until the improvements were completed. Corden, General Manager Jon Carter and Racing Manager Jimmy Nunn were powerless to stop the stadium closing for the first time since it had opened in 1932.

The stadium was to re-open following investment and David Gunson was brought in as Racing Manager but the track suffered a second closure in the spring of 1990 following a mistake with the betting licence. Tennents provided major sponsorship deals until 1991 when A&S Leisure (owners of five casino restaurants) stepped in and purchased the track spending a £3 million on refurbishment. Attendances rose and Dave Baldwin stepped in to take over from Dave Gunson and Barrie Draper became a major trainer.

21st century
Another major refurbishment took place in 2008. Former Greyhound Racing Association manager John Gilburn arrived as managing director and secured the prestigious trainers' championship for the first time in the track's history in 2009 and then again in 2014. Additionally a second home competition the Three Steps to Victory was inaugurated in 2003.

In 2018 the stadium signed a deal with ARC to race every Monday and Thursday afternoon and every Tuesday and Saturday evening. In November 2019 the stadium opened a new £6 million conference centre and executive suite facility. Further improvements were announced in May 2022 with a £400,000 refurbishment that included a track replacement, a new running rail and drainage.

Competitions
Steel City Cup
Three Steps to Victory
Northern Sprint
Puppy Cup
Ebor Stakes (1982)

Track records

Current records

Pre Metric records

Post Metric records

Football
The world's oldest football club, Sheffield, used the stadium before their move to Dronfield.

References

Hillsborough, South Yorkshire
Sports venues in Sheffield
Speedway venues in England
Greyhound racing venues in the United Kingdom
Rugby league stadiums in England
Football venues in Sheffield